Stéphane Robert was the defending champion but decided not to participate.
Jonathan Dasnières de Veigy won the title by defeating Jan Hájek 7–5, 6–2 in the final.

Seeds

Draw

Finals

Top half

Bottom half

References
 Main Draw
 Qualifying Draw

Prosperita Open - Singles
2012 Singles